The 2017–18 Tulane Green Wave men's basketball team represented Tulane University during the 2017–18 NCAA Division I men's basketball season. The Green Wave, led by second-year head coach Mike Dunleavy Sr., played their home games at Devlin Fieldhouse in New Orleans, Louisiana as fourth-year members of the American Athletic Conference. They finished the season 14–17, 5–13 in AAC play to finish in 10th place. They lost in the first round of the AAC tournament to Temple.

Previous season 
The Green Wave finished the season 6–25, 3–15 in AAC play to finish in tenth place. They lost in the first round of the AAC tournament to Tulsa.

Offseason

Departures

2017 recruiting class

2018 recruiting class

Roster

Schedule and results

|-
!colspan=9 style=| Exhibition

|-
!colspan=9 style=|  Non-conference regular season

|-
!colspan=6 style=| AAC regular season

|-
!colspan=9 style=| AAC tournament

References

Tulane Green Wave men's basketball seasons
Tulane
Tulane
Tulane